Stenoniscidae is a family of crustaceans belonging to the order Isopoda.

Genera:
 Archeostenoniscus Broly, 2018
 Metastenoniscus Taiti & Ferrara, 1982
 Stenoniscus Aubert & Dollfus, 1890

References

Isopoda